Numinbah Correctional Centre is an open prison on a  reserve 100 km south of Brisbane in the Numinbah Valley.

The centre houses female prisoners, a mix of short and long-term.

It runs different programmes on parenting, addiction recovery and higher education. It has a primary health clinic open 7 days/week, nurse led in collaboration with a local GP.

See also

 List of Australian Prisons

References

Prisons in Queensland